The 1984 Yugoslavian motorcycle Grand Prix was the seventh round of the 1984 Grand Prix motorcycle racing season. It took place on the weekend of 15–17 June 1984 at the Automotodrom Rijeka.

Classification

500 cc

References

Yugoslav motorcycle Grand Prix
Yugoslavian
Motorcycle Grand Prix
Yugoslavian motorcycle Grand Prix